The 2021 Stanford Cardinal football team represented Stanford University in the 2021 NCAA Division I FBS football season. The Cardinal were led by eleventh-year head coach David Shaw. They played their home games at Stanford Stadium as members of the North Division of the Pac-12 Conference.  They finished the season 3–9, 2–7 in Pac-12 play, to finish last place in the North Division. This was Shaw's worst season ever and Stanford's worst record since the team went 1–11 in the 2006 season.

Schedule

Personnel

Roster

Depth chart

Game summaries

vs. Kansas State

Kansas State began with a 14-point lead at halftime with performances by quarterback Skylar Thompson and running back Deuce Vaughn.  The Wildcats managed to score 24 points before allowing Stanford to put points on the board with just 3:16 left in the game.  Stanford head coach David Shaw stated:  "This game was not indicative of how hard we've played, how hard we've practiced and how well we practiced.  Disappointing to me that we didn't go out there and execute better."  Shaw is in his 11th season as Stanford's coach.  Stanford started senior Jack West at quarterback and rotated him with sophomore Tanner McKee throughout the game.

The Wichita Eagle reported that the stadium was mostly filled with Kansas State fans and that Kansas State significantly out-performed Stanford.  Specifically, the paper published that "the Kansas State football team opened its season with a statement victory on Saturday at AT&T Stadium."

at No. 14 USC

In Tanner McKee's first start as Stanford quarterback, the Cardinal pulled off a surprising rout of USC in the Coliseum, leading by as many as 29 points in the 4th quarter. Following the game, USC head coach Clay Helton was fired and replaced by Donte Williams as interim head coach.

at Vanderbilt

No. 24 UCLA

No. 3 Oregon

at No. 22 Arizona State

at Washington State

Washington

Utah

at Oregon State

California

No. 6 Notre Dame

Rankings

References

Stanford
Stanford Cardinal football seasons
Stanford Cardinal football